This article contains a complete list of Michelin starred restaurants in New York City and Westchester County. The 2006 edition was the first edition of the Michelin Guide to New York City to be published. It was the first time that Michelin published a Red Guide for a region outside Europe. In the 2020 edition, the Guide began to include restaurants outside the city's five boroughs, adding Westchester County restaurants to its listing. The 2021 guide was delayed due to the COVID-19 pandemic, but finally was released on May 6, 2021. A new award — the green star, for sustainable gastronomy — was given to Blue Hill at Stone Barns, which has two Michelin stars. Despite the 3-star Eleven Madison Park was temporarily closed for the pandemic and pivoted to a vegan menu upon reopening in June 2021, it has kept its coveted status in the latest 2021-2022 lists.



2021 - 2022 lists

2006 - 2020 lists

See also 
 List of restaurants in New York City

References 

Lists of restaurants
 
Michelin